Alison Flora MacMillan, is a British diplomat, who served as Deputy Governor of Gibraltar from 2013 to 2016. For two periods during 2013 and 2015, MacMillan served as governor in an acting capacity.

Career

MacMillan joined the Foreign and Commonwealth Office (FCO) in February 1982, having previously worked as a translator in Paris. She served in British diplomatic missions in Mexico, the US, Chile and Nicaragua.  MacMillan was made a member of the Royal Victorian Order in the 2013 New Year Honours when she was deputy director of protocol and assistant marshal of the Diplomatic Corps.

Following the resignation of Vice Admiral Sir Adrian Johns in 2013, MacMillan was sworn in to assume the full powers of the governor. She once more served as interim governor when Johns' successor Lieutenant General Sir James Dutton retired in September 2015.

References

British diplomats
Governors of Gibraltar
Living people
Members of the Royal Victorian Order
People from Devon
Year of birth missing (living people)